The German Friend is an Argentine 2012 film directed by Jeanine Meerapfel, and starring Argentine actress Celeste Cid and German actor Max Riemelt. The film premiered on September 18, 2012 at the Argentine GFF (German Film Festival), in Buenos Aires. It tells the story of Sulamit, daughter of Jewish German immigrants, and Friedrich, son of Nazi German immigrants; they meet when teenagers in the Buenos Aires of the 1950s. The big political changes in Germany and the National Reorganization Process in Argentina serve as the background for the film.

Cast 

Celeste Cid as Sulamit Löwenstein
Max Riemelt as Friedrich Burg
Benjamin Sadler as Michael Tendler
Hartmut Becker as Herr Werner Kunheim
Jean Pierre Noher as Philipp Löwenstein
Fernán Mirás as Professor Durán
Daniel Fanego as Eduardo
Adriana Aizemberg as Tante Else

References

2012 films
Films set in Buenos Aires
Films shot in Buenos Aires
Films set in West Germany
Argentine multilingual films
German multilingual films
Argentine drama films
2010s Argentine films